Fraser's rufous thrush (Stizorhina fraseri), also known as the rufous flycatcher-thrush, is a species of bird in the thrush family.

Distribution and habitat
It is found in Angola, Cameroon, Central African Republic, Republic of the Congo, Democratic Republic of the Congo, Equatorial Guinea, Gabon, Guinea, Nigeria, South Sudan, Tanzania, Uganda, and Zambia. Its natural habitat is subtropical or tropical moist lowland forests.

Taxonomy
Finsch's flycatcher-thrush is often considered conspecific with it (BirdLife International 2004). However, Finsch's flycatcher-thrush is treated here as a separate species following the Handbook of the Birds of the World (del Hoyo et al. 2005). Also, the flycatcher-thrushes are sometimes placed in a separate genus, Stizorhina (BirdLife International 2004), but here they are placed in Neocossyphus, again following del Hoyo et al. (2005).

References

Fraser's rufous thrush
Birds of the Gulf of Guinea
Birds of Central Africa
Fraser's rufous thrush
Taxonomy articles created by Polbot